Dorothy Malone (born Mary Dorothy Maloney; January 29, 1924 – January 19, 2018) was an American actress.
Her film career began in 1943, and in her early years, she played small roles, mainly in B-movies, with the exception of a supporting role in The Big Sleep (1946). After a decade, she changed her image, particularly after her role in Written on the Wind (1956), for which she won the Oscar for Best Supporting Actress.

Her career reached its peak by the beginning of the 1960s, and she achieved later success with her television role as Constance MacKenzie on Peyton Place (1964–1968). Less active in her later years, Malone's last screen appearance was in Basic Instinct in 1992.

Malone died on January 19, 2018. She had been one of the last surviving stars from the Golden Age of Hollywood.

Early life
Malone was born Mary Dorothy Maloney  on January 29, 1924in Chicago, one of five children born to Esther Emma "Eloise" Smith and her husband Robert Ignatius Maloney, an auditor for AT&T company. Her two sisters, Patsy and Joan, died from complications of polio. She also had two brothers, Robert and William.

When she was six months old, her family moved to Dallas, Texas. There she modeled for Neiman Marcus and attended Ursuline Academy of Dallas, Highland Park High School, Hockaday Junior College, and later, Southern Methodist University (SMU). She originally considered becoming a nurse. While performing in a play at SMU, she was spotted by a talent scout, Eddie Rubin, who had been looking to find and cast a male actor. 
Malone recalled in 1981,

Career

RKO – as Dorothy Maloney
Malone was signed by RKO at age 18 as Dorothy Maloney. She made her film debut in Gildersleeve on Broadway (1943). She was credited as Dorothy Maloney in The Falcon and the Co-eds (1943), released shortly thereafter. She later recalled, "I was a bridesmaid at a wedding in one picture. In another film, I was the leader of an all-girl orchestra. The only thing I did at RKO of any note was lose my Texas accent." Her RKO appearances included Higher and Higher (1943) with Frank Sinatra, Seven Days Ashore (1944), Show Business (1944) with Eddie Cantor, Step Lively (1944) again with Sinatra, and Youth Runs Wild (1944) for producer Val Lewton. RKO elected not to renew her contract. She made a brief uncredited appearance in One Mysterious Night (1944), a Boston Blackie film for Columbia.

Warner Bros. – as Dorothy Malone
She then signed a contract with Warner Bros. The studio, she said in 1985, changed her surname "from Maloney to Malone. They placed my picture in the newspaper and they gave me a raise."

Malone's early Warner movies included Hollywood Canteen (1944), Too Young to Know (1945), and Frontier Days (1945). She first achieved notice when Howard Hawks cast her as the bespectacled bookstore clerk in The Big Sleep (1946) with Humphrey Bogart. Warner gave her bigger parts in Janie Gets Married (1945), Night and Day (1946), and To the Victor (1946), with Dennis Morgan. Her first lead was Two Guys from Texas (1948) with Morgan and Jack Carson; this film, in her words, established her onscreen persona as "the all-American girl watching the all-American boy do all sorts of things."

She appeared in One Sunday Afternoon (1948) with Dennis Morgan and Janis Paige for director Raoul Walsh; this was a remake of The Strawberry Blonde (1941), with Malone playing the part played by Olivia de Havilland in the original. She was billed third in Flaxy Martin (1949) with Virginia Mayo and Zachary Scott, then played a good girl in a Western with Joel McCrea, South of St Louis (1949). McCrea and she were re-teamed in Colorado Territory (1949), a remake of High Sierra (1941), also for Walsh, her last film before she left the studio.

Freelancer
Columbia used Malone to play Randolph Scott's leading lady in The Man from Nevada (1950). She stayed at that studio for Convicted (1950) and The Killer That Stalked New York (1950). She made Mrs. O'Malley and Mr. Malone (1951) at MGM and played Tim Holt's love interest in RKO's Saddle Legion (1951) and John Ireland's love interest in The Bushwackers (1951). She began acting on television while continuing to appear in films, guest-starring on shows such as The Philco-Goodyear Television Playhouse ("Education of a Fullback", 1951), and Kraft Theatre ("The Golden Slate", 1951).

She relocated to New York City for several months to study acting until producer Hal B. Wallis called her back to appear in Scared Stiff (1953) starring the comedy duo of Dean Martin and Jerry Lewis. Malone appeared in a war film, Torpedo Alley (1952) for Allied Artists. She was a love interest in Westerns with Ronald Reagan (Law and Order, 1953) and Mark Stevens (Jack Slade, 1953). She was also in the thriller Loophole (1954), billed second. She did episodes of The Doctor ("The Runaways", 1953), Omnibus ("The Horn Blows at Midnight", 1953); Four Star Theatre ("Moorings", 1953; "A Study in Panic", 1954), Fireside Theatre ("Afraid to Live", 1954; "Our Son", 1954; "Mr Onion" 1955), Lux Video Theatre ("The Hunted", 1955), The Christophers ("The World Starts with Jimmy", 1955), and General Electric Theatre ("The Clown" with Henry Fonda, 1955).

Film roles included The Lone Gun (1954), a Western with George Montgomery; Pushover (1954), a thriller with Fred MacMurray and Kim Novak; and Private Hell 36 (1954) from director Don Siegel. Malone was reunited with Sinatra in Young at Heart (1954), as a co-star. She had a leading part in Battle Cry (1955), playing a married woman who has an affair with a young soldier (Tab Hunter) during World War II, a box-office hit.
She again co-starred with Ireland in The Fast and the Furious (1955), directed by Ireland but perhaps best remembered for being the first film produced by Roger Corman, who would later recount that Malone "had left her agent and, having no work, accepted a part for next to nothing." He cast her as the female lead in his directorial debut, Five Guns West (1955). At Warner Bros., Malone made a Western with Randolph Scott, Tall Man Riding (1955), then was cast as Liberace's love interest in the unsuccessful film Sincerely Yours (1955). More successful was the Paramount musical comedy Artists and Models (1955), a reunion with Martin and Lewis, where she played the love interest of Martin's character. She then returned to Westerns: At Gunpoint (1955), with MacMurray; Tension at Table Rock (1956), with Richard Egan; and Pillars of the Sky (1956) with Jeff Chandler.

Written on the Wind and stardom

Malone transformed herself into a platinum blonde and shed her "good girl" image when she co-starred with Rock Hudson, Lauren Bacall, and Robert Stack in director Douglas Sirk's drama Written on the Wind (1956). Her portrayal of the dipso-nymphomaniac daughter of a Texas oil baron won her the Academy Award for Best Supporting Actress.

As a result, she was offered more substantial roles in such films as Man of a Thousand Faces (1957), a biopic of Lon Chaney with James Cagney and Tip on a Dead Jockey (1957) with Robert Taylor. Quantez (1957) was another "girl in a Western" part, supporting Fred MacMurray, but The Tarnished Angels (1957) reunited her successfully with Hudson, Sirk, Stack, and producer Albert Zugsmith. Malone was given the important role of Diana Barrymore in the biopic Too Much, Too Soon (1958), but the film was not a success. Malone appeared in Warlock (1959), but went back to guest starring on such television programs as Cimarron City ("A Respectable Girl", 1958) and Alcoa Theatre ("The Last Flight Out", 1960). Malone made a third film with Stack, The Last Voyage (1960), and a third with Hudson, The Last Sunset (1961).

However, she was working more and more in television: Route 66 ("Fly Away Home", 1961), Checkmate ("The Heat of Passion", 1961), Death Valley Days ("The Watch", 1961), The Dick Powell Theatre ("Open Season", 1961), Dr Kildare ("The Administrator", 1962), General Electric Theatre ("Little White Lie", 1961, "Somebody Please Help Me", 1962), The Untouchables with Stack ("The Floyd Gibbons Story", 1962), and The Greatest Show on Earth ("Where the Wire Ends", 1963). Malone was in the first Beach Party (1963) movie, doing most of her scenes with Robert Cummings. She made an uncredited cameo appearance in Fate Is the Hunter (1964).

Peyton Place

From 1964–1968, she played the lead role of Constance MacKenzie on the ABC primetime serial Peyton Place except for a brief stretch where she was absent due to surgery. Lola Albright filled in until her return. Malone agreed for $3,000 a week less than ABC's offer of $10,000 weekly, if she could be home nightly for 6 pm dinner with her two daughters and no shooting on weekends. "I never turned down a mother role", said Malone. "I like playing mothers. I started out as a very young girl in Hollywood doing Westerns, portraying a mother with a couple of kids."

In 1968, she was written out of the show after complaining that she was given little to do. Malone sued 20th Century Fox for $1.6 million for breach of contract; it was settled out of court. She  later returned to the role in the TV movies Murder in Peyton Place (1977) and Peyton Place: The Next Generation (1985).

Later career
After leaving Peyton Place, Malone went to Italy to make a thriller The Insatiables (1969). In Hollywood, she made a TV movie with Sammy Davis Jr., The Pigeon (1969), then returned to guest-starring on TV series such as The Bold Ones: The New Doctors ("Is This Operation Necessary?", 1972), Ironside ("Confessions: From a Lady of the Night", 1973), and Ellery Queen ("The Adventure of the Eccentric Engineer" 1975).

Malone had a supporting part in Abduction (1975). She featured in the miniseries Rich Man, Poor Man (1976) and guest-starred on Police Woman ("The Trick Book", 1976) and The Streets of San Francisco ("Child of Anger", 1977). She was in the TV movie Murder in Peyton Place (1977) and had a supporting role in Golden Rendezvous (1977).

She was seen on television in The Hardy Boys/Nancy Drew Mysteries ("The House on Possessed Hill" 1978), Flying High ("A Hairy Yak Plays Musical Chairs Eagerly" 1978), Vega$ ("Love, Laugh and Die" 1978), and the TV movie Katie: Portrait of a Centerfold (1978).

Malone was in the Canadian soap opera High Hopes (1978) and had supporting parts in Good Luck, Miss Wyckoff (1979), Winter Kills (1979), and The Day Time Ended (1980), and the miniseries Condominium (1980).

In 1981, Malone made her stage debut in Butterflies Are Free in Winnipeg. She was suffering financial troubles at the time due to two expensive divorces and a life-threatening pulmonary embolism.

The producers of Dallas approached her to step into the role of Miss Ellie Ewing when Barbara Bel Geddes vacated the part in 1984 due to illness, but Malone declined. Her later appearances included The Littlest Hobo ("Guardian Angel" 1982), Matt Houston ("Shark Bait" 1983), The Being (1983), Peyton Place: The Next Generation (1985), and Rest in Pieces (1987).
 
In her last screen appearance, she played a mother convicted of murdering her family in Basic Instinct (1992).

Personal life
Malone was a Democrat and campaigned for Adlai Stevenson during the 1952 presidential election.

Malone, a Roman Catholic, wed actor Jacques Bergerac on June 28, 1959, at a Catholic church in Hong Kong, where she was on location for her 1960 film The Last Voyage. They had two daughters, Mimi (born 1960) and Diane (born 1962) and divorced on December 8, 1964.

Malone then married New York businessman and broker Robert Tomarkin on April 3, 1969, at the Silver Bells Wedding Chapel in Las Vegas, Nevada. Her second marriage was later annulled after Malone claimed that Tomarkin married her because of her money.

Malone married Dallas motel chain executive Charles Huston Bell on October 2, 1971, and they divorced after three years.

Around 1971, Malone moved her daughters from Southern California to suburban Dallas, Texas, where she had been raised.

Death
Malone died of natural causes on January 19, 2018, 10 days before her 94th birthday, at a nursing facility in Dallas. She is entombed at Calvary Hill Cemetery and Mausoleum in Dallas.

Recognition
Malone has a star on the Hollywood Walk of Fame at 1718 Vine in the Motion Pictures section. It was dedicated February 8, 1960.

Filmography

References

External links

 
 
  (on shooting The Last Voyage)
 Dorothy Malone photo gallery
 Dorothy Malone at AllMovie.com
 Dorothy Malone(Aveleyman)
Dorothy Malone  at Find a Grave

1924 births
2018 deaths
20th-century American actresses
Actresses from Chicago
Actresses from Dallas
American people of Irish descent
American Roman Catholics
American film actresses
American television actresses
Best Supporting Actress Academy Award winners
California Democrats
Hockaday School alumni
Illinois Democrats
RKO Pictures contract players
Southern Methodist University alumni
Texas Democrats
Warner Bros. contract players
21st-century American women
Catholics from California
Catholics from Illinois
Catholics from Texas